The Miracle of Sound in Motion is the third studio album by Steel Pole Bath Tub, released on May 10, 1993 by Boner Records.

Track listing

Personnel 
Adapted from The Miracle of Sound in Motion liner notes.

Steel Pole Bath Tub
 Dale Flattum – bass guitar, vocals
 Mike Morasky – guitar, sampler, vocals
 Darren Morey (as D.K. Mor-X) – drums, piano, vocals
Additional musicians
Tom Flynn – guitar
T. W. Pain – backing vocals
Alicia J. Rose – accordion
Mia Doi Todd – mandolin

Production and additional personnel
Eric Holland – production, engineering
George Horn – mastering
Burt Portnoy – illustrations
Sam Suliman – design

Release history

References

External links 
 

1993 albums
Boner Records albums
Steel Pole Bath Tub albums